The City Academy Bristol Storm are a British basketball team based in Bristol. They currently play in the England Basketball Women's National League South West.

The club was formed for the 2006/2007 season based at the City Academy in the centre of Bristol. The team was built around the players from the Ravens and Thunder local league teams.  As additional strength former Backwell School players Nicola Gowing (University of Bath) and Ruth & Trish Groves (UWIC) came home to play for the Storm.

The club has a strong development programme with its development women playing in the West of England Basketball Association (WEBBA) local league, and will be running a summer league during June, July and August to help further develop other local players.

In addition to this the club has branched out into Men's, under 14s and under 16s presuming the number of players continue to keep increasing during the summer months. As well as the partnership with City Academy, Storm have partnerships with St Mary Redcliffe and over forty two primary schools in the central Bristol area including St Patricks and Hannah Moore. A community programme is also underway with the New Deal Communities covering OBI, Midnight Madness, Youth Clubs etc.

References

External links 
 

Women's basketball teams in England
Sport in Bristol
Basketball teams established in 2006